Delaine Mentoor (born 26 May 1993) is a South African water polo coach. She was the head coach of the South Africa women's national water polo team at the 2020 Summer Olympics, becoming the first female head coach in the men's and women's Olympic water polo tournaments.

References

External links
 

1993 births
Living people
South African female water polo players
South African water polo coaches
South Africa women's national water polo team coaches
Water polo coaches at the 2020 Summer Olympics
20th-century South African women
21st-century South African women